Mahesh Shankar is an Indian Music Director. He is also the Chief Technology Officer at Influx, and was responsible for creating Fandromeda, a fantasy sports site which offers games for cricket, football, kabaddi and more.

Compositions
 Mugangal 2002 Tamil Music album
 Knock Knock, I'm Looking to Marry (2003)
 Flavors (2004)
 Vennela (2005)
 Prayanam (2009)
 Inkosaari (2010)
 Prasthanam (2010)
 Vareva  (2011)
 Poga (2012)
 Bangaru Kodipetta (2013)
 D for Dopidi (2013)
 Manamantha (2016)
 Endukila Web Series (2017) 
 Songs for The Family Man (2021)
 Songs for Farzi (2023)

References

External links
 
 Tententen website

Telugu film score composers
Living people
Year of birth missing (living people)